Scott Cranham (born September 8, 1954) is a Canadian diver, who represented Canada at the 1972 Summer Olympics, the 1974 British Commonwealth Games, the 1976 Summer Olympics and the 1978 Commonwealth Games. He was also slated to compete in the 1980 Summer Olympics, but did not attend due to Canada's participation in the 1980 Summer Olympics boycott.

Cranham won medals in both of his Commonwealth Games competitions, but did not win Olympic medals.

Cranham came out as gay after his competitive career ended. In his autobiography Breaking the Surface, Greg Louganis wrote that Cranham was the first fellow athlete to whom Louganis ever came out; Cranham himself was still in the closet at the time and did not react positively, although the two are now friends. (Cranham was portrayed by Gregor Trpin in the book's 1997 film adaptation Breaking the Surface: The Greg Louganis Story.) He also competed at the 1990 Gay Games in Vancouver and the 1994 Gay Games in New York City, winning medals in the Age 35-39 competition class at both events.

He remains active as a diving coach and staffer for Diving Plongeon Canada, the national coordinating organization of diving clubs and programs in Canada.

Achievements

References

1954 births
Living people
Olympic divers of Canada
Divers at the 1972 Summer Olympics
Divers at the 1976 Summer Olympics
Canadian LGBT sportspeople
Gay sportsmen
LGBT divers
Divers at the 1974 British Commonwealth Games
Divers at the 1978 Commonwealth Games
Commonwealth Games silver medallists for Canada
Commonwealth Games bronze medallists for Canada
Divers from Toronto
Canadian male divers
Canadian diving coaches
Commonwealth Games medallists in diving
20th-century Canadian people
21st-century Canadian people
Medallists at the 1974 British Commonwealth Games
Medallists at the 1978 Commonwealth Games
21st-century Canadian LGBT people
20th-century Canadian LGBT people
Canadian gay men